Eric Johnson is an American television weeknight news anchor for KOMO 4 in Seattle, Washington.

Early life
Eric was born to Jack and Rachell Johnson and raised in the Spokane Valley. Eric attended East Valley High School and majored in broadcasting in the Edward R. Murrow School of Communications at Washington State University. He also played baseball at WSU as a pitcher (he says with very limited success).

Broadcasting career

Eric Johnson began his broadcasting career in 1984 at KTVB 7 in Boise, Idaho, serving as the station's weekend sports anchor. Two years later, he was promoted into the role of sports director at rival station KBCI-TV (now KBOI 2). From 1987 to 1989, he served in the same capacity at Spokane's KREM 2, then he moved to sister station KGW 8 in Portland, Oregon, where he remained until 1993.

Upon arriving at KOMO 4 in 1993, he initially started out as the station's weekend sports anchor, replacing longtime KOMO sportscaster Rick Meeder and fill-in sports anchor Bob Rondeau. In 1994, he created a popular segment titled "Eric's Little Heroes", which focuses on the athletic plight of Seattle-area children in Little League games across the area, and is presented in an off-the-wall and humorous fashion. (In 2006, Eric's Little Heroes was discontinued, until strong viewer support brought the feature back in early 2008).

In September, 1995, longtime KOMO sports director Bruce King retired from broadcasting the eleven o'clock evening sportscasts, leading the way for Eric Johnson to assume the role of KOMO sports director. In July 1996, Bruce King retired from KOMO-TV after a career spanning more than 30 years, and in his retirement, he named Eric Johnson as the new sports director for all weeknight editions of KOMO News 4.

In his 25 years at KOMO, Eric has been awarded more than 25 Regional Emmy Awards, and in 2007, he was given the highest prize in local television news, a National Edward R. Murrow Award for best feature story in the country. His career at KOMO has seen him cover nearly every major sports event in Seattle, and in some cases abroad. He produced an award-winning documentary about a group of American children who traveled to Cuba to play a series of baseball games against Cuban teams. And in 2005, he led coverage of the Seattle Seahawks trip to the Super Bowl. He can frequently be seen reporting live on location, whenever the Mariners, Sonics, or Seahawks are playing.

In the second half of 2006, Johnson began anchoring the news for the first time. He took over the reins of KOMO 4 News at 5 o'clock from longtime news anchor Dan Lewis, when KOMO underwent a broadcast schedule change involving their evening newscast lineup. Lewis anchored the 6 p.m. and 11 p.m. news with Kathi Goertzen (2007-2008), and with Mary Nam (2008-2014). Johnson anchored the 5 p.m. news with Kathi Goertzen (2007-2008), and Mary Nam or Dan Lewis (2008-2012). Johnson currently anchors the 5 p.m. newscast with Molly Shen, and the 6 p.m. and 11 p.m. newscasts with Mary Nam after his colleague Dan Lewis stepped away from the anchor desk after 27 years in May 2014. His colleague Dan Lewis' son Tim (former weekend sports anchor for KOMO 4) formerly held the role as sports director at KREM 2 from January 2009-May 2012, the role Johnson held from 1987-1989.

References

External links
Official Biography on KOMO-TV's Website

Year of birth missing (living people)
Living people
Washington State University alumni
Television anchors from Seattle
Regional Emmy Award winners